This is a non-exhaustive list of Bermuda women's international footballers – association football players who have appeared at least once for the senior Bermuda women's national football team.

Players

See also 
 Bermuda women's national football team

References 

 
International footballers
Bermuda
Football in Bermuda
Association football player non-biographical articles
footballers